The following railroad lines have been called the Atlantic Line or a similar name:

The Atlantic Branch of the Long Island Rail Road in New York City
The Atlantic Avenue Elevated line of the Boston Elevated Railway
The Atlantic City Line of New Jersey Transit
The southern pair of tracks of the South London Line
The Atlantic Coast Line, Cornwall